Cecilio Guante Magallanes (born February 1, 1960) is a Dominican former professional baseball player. He made his Major League Baseball(MLB) debut with the Pittsburgh Pirates and ended his career after playing with the Cleveland Indians. He finished his career with a 29–34 won/loss record and a 3.48 ERA. He worked exclusively as a relief pitcher (save for one start in 1990).

Personal information
Guante was born in Villa Mella, Dominican Republic. His height is 6'3" and his playing weight was 205 lb. He was a right-handed pitcher and also a right-handed batter.

Baseball career
Guante won a silver medal for the Dominican Republic at the 1979 Pan American Games and was signed as an amateur free agent by the Pittsburgh Pirates the same year. He was called up to the big leagues in 1982. He played five seasons for the Pirates, working exclusively as a relief pitcher. His strongest season was in 1985, when Guante posted a 4–6 record in 63 games. He pitched 109.0 innings, had 92 strikeouts, a 2.72 ERA and a 1.138 WHIP.

In 1987, Guante was traded to the New York Yankees, a team looking for pitching help. He was traded with Pat Clements and Rick Rhoden to the Yankees for Doug Drabek, Brian Fisher, and Logan Easley. This trade of prospects for older veterans came back to haunt the Yankees, as the young Drabek went on to win the National League Cy Young Award in 1990 and had a solid major league career until he retired in 1998.

To make matters worse for the Yankees, Guante had a 5.73 ERA in 1987. By comparison, the average ERA for an American League pitcher in 1987 was 4.38. Though Guante had a statistically strong year in 1988 (5 wins and a 2.82 ERA), he was traded to the Texas Rangers for Dale Mohorcic before the season was over. Guante played two more full seasons before leaving MLB for good.

Guante briefly played for CPBL's Uni-President Lions in 1992 after leaving the major leagues.

Guante wore a giant G for Guante on his glove, as can be seen here.

References

External links

1960 births
Living people
Águilas Cibaeñas players
Azucareros del Este players
Baseball players at the 1979 Pan American Games
Buffalo Bisons (minor league) players
Cleveland Indians players
Dominican Republic expatriate baseball players in the United States
Dominican Republic national baseball team players
Hawaii Islanders players

Major League Baseball pitchers
Major League Baseball players from the Dominican Republic
Nashua Pirates players
New York Yankees players
Pan American Games medalists in baseball
Pan American Games silver medalists for the Dominican Republic
Pawtucket Red Sox players
People from Santo Domingo Norte
Pittsburgh Pirates players
Portland Beavers players
Salem Pirates players
Shelby Pirates players
Texas Rangers players
Medalists at the 1979 Pan American Games